Misme may refer to:
 Misme (mythology), mother of Ascalabus
 Jane Misme (1865–1935), French journalist and feminist
 Ronald Rey Quispe Misme, a Bolivian race-walker
 Whitney Misme, a competitor in El Gran Show (season 3)
 Mis-me', a historic village of the Chilula tribe

See also 

 Clotilde Brière-Misme
 Mesme

 MISME Syndrome